In enzymology, an arogenate dehydrogenase (NADP+) is an enzyme that catalyzes the chemical reaction

L-arogenate + NADP+  L-tyrosine + NADPH + CO2

Thus, the two substrates of this enzyme are L-arogenate and NADP+, whereas its 3 products are L-tyrosine, NADPH, and CO2.

This enzyme belongs to the family of oxidoreductases, specifically those acting on the CH-CH group of donor with NAD+ or NADP+ as acceptor.  The systematic name of this enzyme class is L-arogenate:NADP+ oxidoreductase (decarboxylating). Other names in common use include arogenic dehydrogenase (ambiguous), pretyrosine dehydrogenase (ambiguous), TyrAAT1, TyrAAT2, and TyrAa.

References

 
 
 
 

EC 1.3.1
NADPH-dependent enzymes
Enzymes of unknown structure